Gnorimoschema clavatum is a moth in the family Gelechiidae. It was described by Povolný in 1998. It is found in North America, where it has been recorded from Saskatchewan.

The length of the forewings is about 5 mm. The forewings are deep brown to blackish with a broad whitish stripe and a less distinct whitish subterminal transverse band at three-fourths of the costal margin. There are mixed blackish and white scales at the apex. The hindwings are grey with a blackish margin.

References

Gnorimoschema
Moths described in 1998